The Sacred Heart Church is a Roman Catholic church in Doboj, Bosnia and Herzegovina.

References 

Doboj
Doboj
Roman Catholic churches completed in 2005
21st-century Roman Catholic church buildings
Buildings and structures in Republika Srpska